Masotta is a surname. Notable people with the surname include:

Karina Masotta (born 1971), Argentine field hockey player
Oscar Masotta (1930–1979), Argentine writer